Ivan Jukić (born 26 December 1991) is a Croatian water polo player. He is currently playing for VK Solaris. He is 6 ft 2 in (1.89 m) tall and weighs 181 lb (82 kg).

References

External links

FOTO Vratar ‘Sunčanih’ i njegova djevojka izrekli sudbonosno ‘da’. Kum se netom prije okitio zlatom na Malti

1991 births
Living people
Croatian male water polo players